Monocle was an American satirical magazine, published irregularly  from the late 1950s until the mid-1960s. Victor Navasky co-founded the magazine while he was at Yale Law School and served as its first editor. From 1961 to 1965, it was edited by C. D. B. Bryan. Calvin Trillin, Dan Wakefield, Neil Postman, Richard Lingeman, Dan Greenburg, and humorist Marvin Kitman also contributed.

Monocle was founded by a group of Yale Law School students as a "leisurely quarterly" (issued, in fact, twice a year). After graduation they moved to New York City, where the magazine, in its editors' words, initially "operated more or less like the UN police force—we came out whenever there was an emergency." Later, it became a "leisurely monthly", with the intent of appearing about ten times a year.

Navasky recounts in detail the history of his founding and direction of  Monocle in his 2004 memoir, Matters of Opinion.

The Monocle Peep Show
The chapter headings of the anthology The Monocle Peep Show (1965) give a sense of both the magazine's subject matter and its politically irreverent tone. The book is divided into "Black and White Journalism" (on race in America), "Yellow Journalism" (on East Asia, including the Vietnam War), "Red Journalism" (on communism and the Cold War), "Off-color Journalism" (two pieces, one about a not-so-ex-Nazi rocket scientist and the other about someone campaigning for the papacy), and Red, White & Blue Journalism, on American electoral politics. The "Black and White Journalism" chapter includes, among other things, a piece by African American comedian Godfrey Cambridge called "My Taxi Problem and Ours"—the title alludes to Norman Podhoretz's then-recent essay "My Negro Problem—And Ours"—a superhero comic called "Captain Melanin", and a piece called "We're Not Prejudiced But…" containing a series of one-liners such as "Do Negro Catholic couples have an innate sense of rhythm?" and "Did Gov. George Wallace come within a backlash of winning the Wisconsin primary?"

Notes and references

 The Monocle Peep Show, Bantam Books (1965 paperback)

Monthly magazines published in the United States
Defunct political magazines published in the United States
Satirical magazines published in the United States
Defunct magazines published in the United States
Magazines established in 1956
Magazines established in 1965
Magazines published in New York City
Mass media in New Haven, Connecticut
Magazines published in Connecticut